Vingulmark (Old Norse Vingulmörk) is the old name for the area in Norway which today makes up the counties of Østfold, western parts of Akershus (excluding Romerike), and eastern parts of Buskerud (Hurum and Røyken municipalities), and includes the site of Norway's capital, Oslo. During the Middle Ages, Vingulmark was an administrative unit limited to Oslo, Bærum and Asker.

Etymology
The Old Norse form of the name was Vingulmǫrk. The first part of the name, Vingul, is the accusative case of Vingull, "fescue", or "fool". The last element of the name, mark or plural mǫrk, "forest" or "March", i.e. the forest of fescues/fools.

History
According to medieval kings' sagas, it was a Viking Age petty kingdom. Vingulmark was one of the four counties under the Court of Law, which together constituted the ancient landscape of Viken. Archaeologists have made finds of richly endowed burials in the area around the estuary of the river Glomma, at Onsøy, Rolvsøy and Tune, where the remains of a ship, the Tune ship, were found. This indicates that there was an important center of power in this area.

There are indications that at least the southern part of this area was under Danish rule in the late 9th century. In the account of Ottar, which was written down at the court of the English king Alfred the Great, Ottar says that when he sailed south from Skiringssal, he had Denmark on the port side for three days. This would include parts of Vingulmark.

Snorri Sturluson writes in Heimskringla and Fagrskinna, that King Harald Fairhair inherited part of Vingulmark from his father Halfdan the Black. King Harald defeated King Gandalf, who had previously held half of Vingulmark. Snorri Sturluson relates in Heimskringla that the area was also claimed by the Swedish King Erik Emundsson. The Norwegians invaded Götaland to defend their claim.

Legendary rulers
The sagas name several more or less legendary kings as rulers of Vingulmark:
 Gudrød the Hunter, half of Vingulmark
 Alfgeir (Old Norse: Álfgeir)
 Gandalf Alfgeirsson
 Halfdan the Black
 Olaf Haraldsson
 Tryggve Olafsson
 Harald Gudrødsson Grenske, 976-987

See also
 Germanic peoples

References

Other sources

External links
Heimskringla references 

History of Oslo
Petty kingdoms of Norway